WWE Bad Blood (originally stylized as Badd Blood) was a professional wrestling pay-per-view (PPV) event produced by World Wrestling Entertainment (WWE), a Connecticut-based professional wrestling promotion. The event was first held in October 1997 when the promotion was still called the World Wrestling Federation (WWF) and that first event was held as the 18th In Your House PPV. After six years and after the promotion had been renamed to WWE, Bad Blood returned as its own PPV in June 2003, replacing King of the Ring. To coincide with the brand extension, the 2003 and 2004 Bad Blood events were both held exclusively for wrestlers of the Raw brand division. In 2005, One Night Stand replaced Bad Blood; Vengeance had also moved to June that year as The Great American Bash moved to July. The first Bad Blood is known for introducing the Hell in a Cell match, which was contested as the main event match all three years the pay-per-view was held. Bad Blood had been announced to be revived in 2017; however, these plans were scrapped in favor of an event titled Great Balls of Fire.

History
Bad Blood was first held as an In Your House pay-per-view (PPV) event. In Your House was a series of monthly PPVs first produced by the World Wrestling Federation (WWF, now WWE) in May 1995. They aired when the promotion was not holding one of its major PPVs and were sold at a lower cost. Badd Blood: In Your House was the 18th In Your House event and took place on October 5, 1997, at the Kiel Center in St. Louis, Missouri. The event was notable for introducing the Hell in a Cell match.

In May 2002, the WWF was renamed to World Wrestling Entertainment (WWE) as a result of a lawsuit from the World Wildlife Fund over the "WWF" initialism. Also around this time, the promotion held a draft that split its roster into two distinctive brands of wrestling, Raw and SmackDown!, where wrestlers were exclusively assigned to perform. In 2003, WWE reinstated Bad Blood as its own PPV (with the stylization being "Bad Blood" instead of the previous "Badd Blood") to replace the previously annual King of the Ring PPV; King of the Ring ceased being produced as a PPV, but the titular tournament continued to be produced periodically. To coincide with the brand extension, both the 2003 and 2004 Bad Blood events, which were both held in June, exclusively featured wrestlers from the Raw brand. Like the original event, the 2003 and 2004 events featured a Hell in a Cell match as the main event. After the 2004 event, however, Bad Blood was discontinued and doubly replaced by One Night Stand and Vengeance; the latter had also moved into the June slot as The Great American Bash moved into the July slot that Vengeance previously held. 

In March 2017, WWE announced that it would be reviving Bad Blood to be held on July 9, 2017, from the XL Center in Hartford, Connecticut. However, these plans were scrapped in favor of an event titled Great Balls of Fire.

Events

See also
WWE Hell in a Cell

References

External links 
Results at Prowrestlinghistory.com

 
Recurring events established in 1997
Recurring events disestablished in 2004